The 1901 Washington Senators won 61 games, lost 72, and finished in sixth place in the American League in its first year as a major league team. They were managed by Jim Manning and played home games at the American League Park I.

Regular season

Season standings

Record vs. opponents

Roster

Player stats

Batting

Starters by position 
Note: Pos = Position; G = Games played; AB = At bats; H = Hits; Avg. = Batting average; HR = Home runs; RBI = Runs batted in

Other batters 
Note: G = Games played; AB = At bats; H = Hits; Avg. = Batting average; HR = Home runs; RBI = Runs batted in

Pitching

Starting pitchers 
Note: G = Games pitched; IP = Innings pitched; W = Wins; L = Losses; ERA = Earned run average; SO = Strikeouts

Other pitchers 
Note: G = Games pitched; IP = Innings pitched; W = Wins; L = Losses; ERA = Earned run average; SO = Strikeouts

References 

1901 Washington Senators at Baseball-Reference
1901 Washington Senators team page at www.baseball-almanac.com
1901 Washington Senators historical game recaps at www.chronicledbaseball.com

Minnesota Twins seasons
Washington Senators season
Washington